Bengt Magnus Kristoffer Berg (9 January 1885 – 31 July 1967) was a Swedish ornithologist, zoologist, wildlife photographer, and writer. He is best remembered for photos and movies of birds, taken on several expeditions. His avifauna photography is highly celebrated.

Selected works (in German) 
 Abu Markub. Mit der Filmkamera unter Elefanten und Riesenstörchen. Reimer, Berlin 1940
 Arizona Charleys Junge. Verlag Putty, Wuppertal 1954
 Der Lämmergeier im Himalaja. Antigone-Verlag, Allendorf/Eder 2006, 
 Die letzten Adler. Reimer, Berlin 1943
 Die Liebesgeschichte einer Wildgans. Reimer, Berlin 1949
 Mein Freund, der Regenpfeifer. Antigone-Verlag, Allendorf/Eder 2003, 
 Meine Jagd nach dem Einhorn. Rütten & Loening, Frankfurt/M. 1933
 Mit den Zugvögeln nach Afrika. Antigone-Verlag, Allendorf/Eder 2001, 
 Tiger und Mensch. Limpert-Verlag, Frankfurt/M. 1958

References

External links
Biography (Swedish)

1885 births
1967 deaths
20th-century Swedish poets
Balloon-borne experiments
Swedish male poets
Nature photographers
Swedish ornithologists
People from Kalmar
Swedish male writers
20th-century Swedish zoologists